Afelee Falema Pita (born February 11, 1958) is a Tuvaluan diplomat. He was Tuvalu's Permanent Representative to the United Nations from 19 December 2006. to December 2012.  He also was the ambassador to the United States. 

Pita holds a master's degree in public administration from the University of Canberra and a Bachelor of Arts degree in administration and accounting from the University of the South Pacific.

He began his career as a senior official in government administration as assistant Secretary, and then Secretary, at the Tuvaluan Ministry of Commerce and Natural Resources, from 1987 to 1988. He was Assistant Secretary for Commerce from 1989 to 1993, then Acting Secretary at the Ministry of Trade, Commerce and Public Corporations in 1993. From 1994 to 1994, he served as Permanent Secretary in several successive ministries (Health and Sports, Labour and Communication, Resources and Environment, Finance).

From 2001 to 2004, Pita was Adviser to the Executive Director of the Asian Development Bank in Manila, where he served as representative for Australia, Azerbaijan, Cambodia, Hong Kong, Kiribati, the Federated States of Micronesia, Nauru, the Solomon Islands and Tuvalu.

Returning to Tuvalu, Pita served as Permanent Secretary to the Ministry of Natural Resources and Lands from 2004 and 2006, before being appointed as Permanent Representative to the United Nations.

In April 2007, Pita addressed the Special Session of the United Nations Security Council on Energy, Climate and Security, and "beseech[ed] the Security Council to act urgently to address the threats to [Tuvalu]'s national security" - namely, climate change.

References

External links
 Text of Pita's address to the Special Session of the Security Council on Energy, Climate and Security, April 17, 2007
 Video: Afelee Pita addresses the General Assembly of the United Nations, September 28, 2010

Tuvaluan diplomats
Permanent Representatives of Tuvalu to the United Nations
University of Canberra alumni
University of the South Pacific alumni
1958 births
Living people
Ambassadors of Tuvalu to the United States